The BRP Bacolod City (LS-550) is the lead ship of two Bacolod City class logistics support vessel, and is based on a helicopter capable variant of the US Army's Frank S. Besson class. She is also considered one of the most modern transport ships in the Philippine Navy, having been commissioned during the early 1990s. She was previously known as BRP Bacolod City (LC-550) prior to a classification change implemented by the Philippine Navy starting April 2016.

History
The BRP Bacolod City was built by Halter/Moss Point Marine of Escatawpa, Mississippi in the United States and was commissioned into Philippine Navy in 1993. Both ships of its class were purchased brand-new by the Philippine government through the FMS program of the United States. Since its commissioning, both ships of its class have been rigorously used in military and peacetime operations, and have taken part in joint military exercises with foreign navies as well.

Presently it is assigned with the Service Force of the Philippine Fleet.

Technical details
The ship is powered by two General Motors-EMD 16-645EZ6 diesel engines with a combined power of around 5,800 hp driving two propellers.

As an amphibious transport, it is fairly armed for defensive purposes, and carries two M2 12.7mm machine guns at the front side decks, and two Mk.10 Oerlikon 20 mm cannons near its two LCVPs.

The prime mission of the ship is the direct transport and discharge of liquid and dry cargo to shallow terminal areas, remote under-developed coastlines and on inland waterways.

The ship does not require external cranes or port facilities, and even in only four feet of water under full load, the ship is still able to land. This capability expands the choice of landing locations, and at the same time reduces the potential enemy impact on the logistics support operations.

The ships have a capacity to transport up to 48 TEU or 2,280 tons vehicles/general cargo, or up to 900 tons on Logistics Over The Shore (LOTS) / amphibious operations. Its ramps and the main deck are able to withstand roll-on/roll-off operations of even heavy main battle tanks.

Notable Operations

Exercises
Bacolod City joined BRP Juan Magluyan (PG-392) and BRP Artemio Ricarte (PS-37) and the Essex Expeditionary Strike Group during the sea exercise phase of the RP-US Balikatan 2008 in February 2008.

On 19–23 July 2011, BRP Bacolod City together with BRP Quezon (PS-70) was part of Amphibious Exercise PAGSISIKAP 2011 held in Manila Bay.

Deployments
The Bacolod City together with BRP Emilio Jacinto (PS-35) under Naval Task Group 80 will be part of 262-member contingent representing the Philippine Navy in the Langkawi International Maritime and Aerospace (LIMA) Exhibition 2011 from 6–10 December 2011 in Langkawi, Malaysia.

As part of the Armed Forces of the Philippines' response to the Coronavirus pandemic in the country, BRP Bacolod City sailed to China to obtain the medical supplies purchased by the Philippine government. Bacolod City arrived in the port of Xiamen on April 25, 2020 where the ship stayed for five days loading 23,385 boxes of personal protective equipment, 700,000 KN95 face masks and 200,000 sets of PPEs, consisting of goggles, coverall suit, head cover, gloves, shoe cover, surgical mask, and surgical gowns stored in 33 container boxes. Bacolod City left Xiamen on April 30 escorted by the PLA-N's Type 056 corvette Quanzhou (588). Bacolod City returned to the Philippines on May 8, 2020 to deliver the medical supplies to Davao City. Bacolod City left Davao on May 14 on the way to Cebu City for a scheduled port call but was then diverted to sail straight back to Naval Station Sangley Point, Cavite. The ship arrived in Cavite on May 21, 2020.

Gallery

References

External links
 Philippine Navy Official website
 Philippine Fleet Official Website
 BRP Bacolod City threads @ Philippine Defense Forum
 World Navies Today: Philippines
 Opus224's Unofficial Philippine Defense Page

Bacolod City-class support vessels
Ships built in Moss Point, Mississippi
1993 ships